Jack Dalton may refer to:

People
 Jack Dalton (baseball) (1885–1950), baseball player
 Jack Dalton (explorer), explorer and cartographer of Tatshenshini River
 Jack Dalton (footballer) (1876–1923), Australian rules footballer for Fitzroy
 Jack Dalton, a ring name of professional wrestler Don Fargo (1930–2015)

Fictional characters
 Jack Dalton (EastEnders), fictional character from EastEnders
 Jack Dalton (MacGyver), fictional character from MacGyver
 Jack Dalton, fictional character from Lucky Luke

See also
 John Dalton (disambiguation)